Ajnala Assembly constituency (Sl. No.:11) is a Punjab Legislative Assembly constituency in Amritsar district, Punjab state, India.

List of MLAs 
Members of Punjab Legislative Assembly Ajnala.

Election results

2022

2017

Previous Results

See also 
Punjab Legislative Assembly

References

External links
  

Assembly constituencies of Punjab, India
Amritsar district